Jean-Barthélémy Bokassa (born 30 August 1974 in Bangui, Central African Republic) is a French-Central African socialite, artist and novelist. He is the eldest grandson of Jean-Bedel Bokassa, the 2nd President of the Central African Republic and later the self-proclaimed Emperor Bokassa I of its successor state, the Central African Empire.

Ancestry 
Bokassa comes from an influential political family. As a member of the House of Bokassa, he is not simply a descendant of Jean-Bedel Bokassa but also related to former President of the Central African Republic David Dacko and is the great-great nephew of Barthélémy Boganda, the first Prime Minister of the Central African Republic after whom he was named. His mother Martine Nguyen Bokassa, is the sole offspring of Jean-Bedel Bokassa's first marriage to the Vietnamese Nguyen Thi Hué, who married Jean-Bedel Bokassa during the First Indochina War.

References

1974 births
Mbaka people
Central African royalty
Living people
Paris Dauphine University alumni
French people of Central African Republic descent
French people of Vietnamese descent
French socialites
Central African socialites
Central African Republic novelists
Central African Republic people of Vietnamese descent
House of Bokassa